Retail Post Outlet or RPO is a term used by Canada Post to designate a facility located inside a retail business (such as a grocery store, or a pharmacy) "for the purpose of providing postal retail sales and services and, in some cases, limited delivery services to the general public."

References

Canada Post